The 2004 ARCA Re/Max Series was the 52nd season of the ARCA Racing Series, a division of the Automobile Racing Club of America (ARCA). The season began on February 7, 2004, with the Daytona ARCA 200 at Daytona International Speedway. The season ended with the Food World 250 at Talladega Superspeedway on October 2 almost eight months later. Frank Kimmel won the driver's championship, his sixth in the series and his fifth in a row, while T. J. Bell won the Rookie of the Year award.

Schedule and results

Drivers' championship
(key) Bold – Pole position awarded by time. Italics – Pole position set by final practice results or rainout. * – Most laps led. ** – All laps led.
{|
| valign="top" |

External links
Official ARCA Website

References

ARCA Menards Series seasons
Arca Remax Series